The 2001 United Kingdom general election was held on Thursday 7 June 2001, four years after the previous election on 1 May 1997, to elect 659 members to the House of Commons. The governing Labour Party was re-elected to serve a second term in government with another landslide victory with a 167 majority, returning 412 members of Parliament versus 418 from the 1997 general election, a net loss of six seats, though with a significantly lower turnout than before—59.4%, compared to 71.6% at the previous election. The number of votes Labour received fell by nearly three million. Tony Blair went on to become the only Labour Prime Minister to serve two consecutive full terms in office. As Labour retained almost all of their seats won in the 1997 landslide victory, the media dubbed the 2001 election "the quiet landslide".

There was little change outside Northern Ireland, with 620 out of the 641 seats in Great Britain electing candidates from the same party as they did in 1997. Factors contributing to the Labour victory included a strong economy, falling unemployment, and public perception that the Labour government had delivered on many key election pledges that it had made in 1997.

The opposition Conservative Party, under William Hague's leadership, was still deeply divided on the issue of Europe and the party's policy platform had drifted considerably to the right. The party put the issue of European monetary union (and in particular, the prospect of the UK joining the Eurozone) at the centre of its campaign, but it failed to resonate with the electorate. A series of publicity stunts that backfired also harmed Hague, and he immediately announced his resignation as party leader when the election result was clear, formally stepping down three months later, therefore becoming the first leader of the Conservative and Unionist Party in the House of Commons since Austen Chamberlain nearly eighty years prior not to serve as prime minister.

The election was largely a repeat of the 1997 general election, with Labour losing only six seats overall and the Conservatives making a net gain of one seat (gaining nine seats but losing eight). The Conservatives gained a seat in Scotland, which ended the party's status as an "England-only" party in the prior parliament, but failed again to win any seats in Wales. Although they did not gain many seats, three of the few new MPs elected were future Conservative Prime Ministers David Cameron and Boris Johnson and future Conservative Chancellor of the Exchequer George Osborne; Osborne would serve in the same Cabinet as Cameron from 2010 to 2016. The Liberal Democrats made a net gain of six seats.

The 2001 general election is the last to date in which any government has held an overall majority of more than 100 seats in the House of Commons, and the second of only two since the Second World War (the other being 1997) in which a single party won over 400 MPs. Notable departing MPs included former Prime Ministers Edward Heath (also Father of the House) and John Major, former Deputy Prime Minister Michael Heseltine, former Liberal Democrat leader Paddy Ashdown, former Cabinet ministers Tony Benn, Tom King, John Morris, Mo Mowlam, John MacGregor and Peter Brooke, Teresa Gorman, and then Mayor of London Ken Livingstone.

Change was seen in Northern Ireland, with the moderate unionist Ulster Unionist Party (UUP) losing four seats to the more hardline Democratic Unionist Party (DUP). A similar transition appeared in the nationalist community, with the moderate Social Democratic and Labour Party (SDLP) losing votes to the more staunchly republican and abstentionist Sinn Féin.

Exceptionally low voter turnout, which fell below 60% for the first (and so far, only) time since 1918, also marked this election. The election was broadcast live on BBC One and presented by David Dimbleby, Jeremy Paxman, Andrew Marr, Peter Snow, and Tony King.

The 2001 general election was notable for being the first in which pictures of the party logos appeared on the ballot paper. Prior to this, the ballot paper had only displayed the candidate's name, address, and party name.

Overview
The election had been expected on 3 May, to coincide with local elections, but on 2 April 2001, both were postponed to 7 June because of rural movement restrictions imposed in response to the foot-and-mouth outbreak that had started in February.

The elections were marked by voter apathy, with turnout falling to 59.4%, the lowest (and first under 70%) since the Coupon Election of 1918. Throughout the election the Labour Party had maintained a significant lead in the opinion polls and the result was deemed to be so certain that some bookmakers paid out for a Labour majority before election day. However, the opinion polls the previous autumn had shown the first Tory lead (though only by a narrow margin) in the opinion polls for eight years as they benefited from the public anger towards the government over the fuel protests which had led to a severe shortage of motor fuel.

By the end of 2000, however, the dispute had been resolved and Labour were firmly back in the lead of the opinion polls. In total, a mere 29 parliamentary seats changed hands at the 2001 Election.

2001 also saw the rare election of an independent. Richard Taylor of Independent Kidderminster Hospital and Health Concern (usually now known simply as "Health Concern") unseated a government MP, David Lock, in Wyre Forest. There was also a high vote for British National Party leader Nick Griffin in Oldham West and Royton, in the wake of recent race riots in the town of Oldham.

In Northern Ireland, the election was far more dramatic and marked a move by unionists away from support for the Good Friday Agreement, with the moderate unionist Ulster Unionist Party (UUP) losing to the more hardline Democratic Unionist Party (DUP). This polarisation was also seen in the nationalist community, with the Social Democratic and Labour Party (SDLP) vote losing out to more left-wing and republican Sinn Féin. It also saw a tightening of the parties as the small UK Unionist Party lost its only seat.

Campaign
For Labour, the last four years had run relatively smoothly. The party had successfully defended all their by election seats, and many suspected a Labour win was inevitable from the start.

Many in the party, however, were afraid of voter apathy, which was epitomised in a poster of "Hague with Margaret Thatcher's hair", captioned "Get out and vote. Or they get in." Despite recessions in mainland Europe and the United States, due to the bursting of global tech bubbles, Britain was notably unaffected and Labour however could rely on a strong economy as unemployment continued to decline toward election day, putting to rest any fears of a Labour government putting the economic situation at risk.

For William Hague, however, the Conservative Party had still not fully recovered from the loss in 1997. The party was still divided over Europe, and talk of a referendum on joining the Eurozone was rife, and as a result "Save The Pound" was one of the key slogans deployed in the Conservatives' campaign.  As Labour remained at the political centre, the Tories moved to the right. A policy gaffe by Oliver Letwin over public spending cuts left the party with an own goal that Labour soon exploited.

Thatcher gave a speech to the Conservative Election Rally in Plymouth on May 22nd 2001, calling New Labour "rootless, empty, and artificial." She also added to Hague's troubles when speaking out strongly against the Euro to applause. Hague himself, although a witty performer at Prime Minister's Questions, was dogged in the press and reminded of his speech, given at the age of 16, at the 1977 Conservative Conference. The Sun newspaper only added to the Conservatives' woes by backing Labour for a second consecutive election, calling Hague a "dead parrot" during the Conservative Party's conference in October 1998.

The Tories campaigned on a strongly right-wing platform, emphasising the issues of Europe, immigration and tax, the fabled "Tebbit Trinity". They also released a poster showing a heavily pregnant Tony Blair, stating "Four years of Labour and he still hasn’t delivered". However, Labour countered by asking where the proposed tax cuts were going to come from, and decried the Tory policy as "cut here, cut there, cut everywhere", in reference to the widespread belief that the Conservatives would make major cuts to public services in order to fund tax cuts.  Labour also capitalised on the strong economic conditions of the time, and another major line of attack (primarily directed towards Michael Portillo, now Shadow Chancellor after returning to Parliament via a by-election) was to warn of a return to "Tory Boom and Bust" under a Conservative administration.

Charles Kennedy contested his first election as leader of the Liberal Democrats.

Controversy
During the election Sharron Storer, a resident of Birmingham, criticised Prime Minister Tony Blair in front of television cameras about conditions in the National Health Service. The widely televised incident happened on 16 May during a campaign visit by Blair to the Queen Elizabeth Hospital in Birmingham. Sharron Storer's partner, Keith Sedgewick, a cancer patient with non-Hodgkin's lymphoma and therefore highly susceptible to infection, was being treated at the time in the bone marrow unit, but no bed could be found for him and he was transferred to the casualty unit for his first 24 hours.  On the evening of the same day Deputy Prime Minister John Prescott punched a protestor after being hit by an egg on his way to an election rally in Rhyl, North Wales.

Endorsements
Labour received endorsements from The Sun, The Daily Express, The Times (for the first time in its history), The Daily Mirror, and The Guardian.
The Independent endorsed Labour and/or the Liberal Democrats.
The Conservatives were endorsed by the Daily Mail and The Daily Telegraph.

Opinion polling

Results
The election result was effectively a repeat of 1997, as the Labour Party retained an overwhelming majority, with the BBC announcing the victory at 02:58 on the early morning of 8 June. Having presided over relatively serene political, economic and social conditions, the feeling of prosperity in the United Kingdom had been maintained into the new millennium, and Labour would have a free hand to assert its ideals in the subsequent parliament. Despite the victory, voter apathy was a major issue, as turnout fell below 60%, 12 percentage points down on 1997. All three of the main parties saw their total votes fall, with Labour's total vote dropping by 2.8 million on 1997, the Conservatives 1.3 million, and the Liberal Democrats 428,000. Some suggested this dramatic fall was a sign of the general acceptance of the status quo and the likelihood of Labour's majority remaining unassailable.

For the Conservatives, the huge loss they had sustained in 1997 was repeated. Despite gaining nine seats, the Tories lost seven to the Liberal Democrats, and one even to Labour. William Hague was quick to announce his resignation, doing so at 07:44 outside the Conservative Party headquarters. Some believed that Hague had been unlucky; although most considered him to be a talented orator and an intelligent statesman, he had come up against the charismatic Tony Blair in the peak of his political career, and it was no surprise that little progress was made in reducing Labour's majority after a relatively smooth parliament.

Staying at what they considered rock bottom, however, showed that the Conservatives had failed to improve their negative public image, had remained somewhat disunited over Europe, and had not regained the trust that they had lost in the 1990s.  Hague's focus on the "Save The Pound" campaign narrative had failed to gain any traction; Labour's successful countertactic was to be repeatedly vague over the issue of future monetary union - and said that the UK would only consider joining the Eurozone "when conditions were right". But in Scotland, despite flipping one seat from the Scottish National Party, their vote collapse continued. They failed to retake former strongholds in Scotland as the Nationalists consolidated their grip on the Northeastern portion of the country.

The Liberal Democrats could point to steady progress under their new leader, Charles Kennedy, gaining more seats than the main two parties—albeit only six overall—and maintaining the performance of a pleasing 1997 election, where the party had doubled its number of seats from 20 to 46. While they had yet to become electable as a government, they underlined their growing reputation as a worthwhile alternative to Labour and Conservative, offering plenty of debate in Parliament and representing more than a mere protest vote.

The SNP failed to gain any new seats and lost a seat to the Conservatives by just 79 votes. In Wales, Plaid Cymru both gained a seat from Labour and lost one to them.

In Northern Ireland the Ulster Unionists, despite gaining North Down, lost five other seats.

:

|}

All parties with more than 500 votes shown.

The seat gains reflect changes on the 1997 general election result. Two seats had changed hands in by-elections in the intervening period. These were as follows:
 Romsey from Conservative to Liberal Democrats. The Liberal Democrats held this seat in 2001.
 South Antrim from Ulster Unionists to Democratic Unionists. The Ulster Unionists won this seat back in 2001.

The results of the election give a Gallagher index of dis-proportionality of 17.74.

Results by constituent country

Seats changing hands

MPs who lost their seats

Voter Demographics 
MORI interviewed 18,657 adults in Great Britain after the election which suggested the following demographic breakdown...

Manifestos 
Labour (Ambitions for Britain)
Conservative (Time for Common Sense)
Liberal Democrat (Freedom, Justice, Honesty)
UK Independence Party
British National Party (Where we stand!)
Green Party of England and Wales
Ulster Unionist Party
Progressive Unionist Party
Social Democratic and Labour Party (It's working – let's keep building)
Plaid Cymru
Scottish National Party (Heart of the Manifesto 2001)
ProLife Alliance
The Democratic Party (The will of the people NOT the party)
Kidderminster Health Concern
Monster Raving Loony Party (Vote for insanity – you know it makes sense)
The Stuckist Party
Scottish Socialist Party
Left Alliance
Communist Party of Britain (People's need before corporate profit greed)
Revolutionary Communist Party of Britain (Marxist-Leninist)

See also 
 List of MPs elected in the 2001 United Kingdom general election
 List of MPs for constituencies in Wales (2001–2005)
 List of MPs for constituencies in Scotland (2001–2005)
 2001 United Kingdom foot-and-mouth outbreak
 2001 United Kingdom general election in Northern Ireland
 2001 United Kingdom general election in England
 2001 United Kingdom general election in Scotland
 2001 United Kingdom general election in Wales
 2001 United Kingdom local elections

References

Bibliography
 Butler, David and Dennis Kavanagh. The British General Election of 2001 (2002), the standard scholarly study

External links
BBC News: Vote 2001 – in depth coverage.
Catalogue of 2001 general election ephemera at the Archives Division of the London School of Economics.

 
2001 elections in the United Kingdom
2001
June 2001 events in the United Kingdom
Tony Blair